Juho Jokinen (born 25 July 1986) is a Finnish ice hockey defenceman who played professionally in Finland for Oulun Kärpät of the SM-liiga. He is the younger brother of NHL winger Jussi Jokinen.

References

External links

1986 births
Living people
HC TPS players
Oulun Kärpät players
People from Kalajoki
Finnish ice hockey defencemen
Sportspeople from North Ostrobothnia